International Management Institute, Bhubaneswar (IMI, Bhubaneswar) is a business school located in Bhubaneswar, the capital of eastern Indian state of Odisha.

The new 16-acre campus commenced classes for the first batch of PGDM (Post Graduate Diploma in Business Management) approved by AICTE in August 2011. The institute is known to carry out research and development and Management Development Programme (MDPs) activities in association with various companies.

Shri. Sanjiv Goenka (Chairman of RP-Sanjiv Goenka Group) is chairperson of IMI, Board of Governors and there are many other notable personalities associated with the institute. Prof. Ramesh Behl is the Director of the IMI, Bhubaneswar. It offers admission through CAT, XAT, CMAT, GMAT examinations.

The first IMI business school campus was set up in Delhi in 1981. It was in 2010 that this RP-SG Group B-school decided to start two new IMI campuses in Bhubaneswar & Kolkata.

Courses offered 
IMI Bhubaneswar offers the following AICTE approved, academic programmes:
 Two-year Post Graduate Diploma in Management
 Post Graduate Diploma in Management–part time
 Fellowship Program in Management

Accreditation and Rankings 
IMI Bhubaneswer is the 13th institution in India to get Association of MBAs (AMBA) accreditation. The PGDM programme of IMI Bhubaneswar is also accredited by National Board of Accreditation (NBA), Ministry of HRD, Govt. of India  and accorded equivalence with MBA degree by Association of Indian Universities (AIU). IMI Bhubaneswar is consistently ranked among the 'Top Private B-Schools' in India. The institution was awarded as a Management College of the Year-2015: Academic Reputation by Higher Education Review (HER) Magazine, ranked Amongst Top-4 Best Emerging B-schools by National HRD Network (NHRDN)- People Matters B-School Survey, awarded as an Outstanding B-School of Excellence by Competition Success Review (CSR) Ranking for B-Schools 2015, ranked Amongst Top-4 Best Emerging B-Schools by Business World, ranked Amongst Top-10 Emerging Business Colleges in India by Silicon India, IMI Bhubaneswar is ranked as the 62nd best management school in India by National Institute of Ranking Framework (NIRF) 2021, Ministry of Human Resource Development, Government of India.

Alliances 
IMI Bhubaneswar has signed a Memorandum of Understanding with the following institutes to collaborate in research activities and Exchange Programs of Students and Faculties:

 EGADE Business School, Mexico City, Mexico. 
 Sichuan Academy of Social Sciences, Chengdu, China. 
 ESC Rennes International School of Business. 
 Manhattan Institute of Management, New York, USA. 
 Centre for Management and Research, Mauritius.

Student life 
The college has various student run committees and clubs under the guidance of faculties, including Placement Committee, Media and PR Committee, Branding Committee and Cultural Committee. The clubs are Prayas club (CSR Club), Fintellects (Finance Club), Cynosure (Operation Club), Insignia (HR club), Colosseum (Marketing Club), Vishleshan (Analytics) Club, Literary Club, Public Policy Club and EBSB Club.

Infrastructure 
The campus is spread across 16 acres and is a fully residential campus located in Gothapatna in the fringes of Bhubaneswar with large classrooms, in house gym and various facilities are provided to the students. The library is over 2 floors and is spread across 6000 sq ft., Beside it features over 14,000 periodicals and 9450 books. The campus has separate canteens to cater to the needs of students and MDP participants along with staff and faculty members.

References 

Business schools in Odisha
Universities and colleges in Bhubaneswar
Educational institutions established in 2011
2011 establishments in Odisha